Deep time is geologic time.

The term is also used in the following ways:
 Joanna Macy uses the term deep time to refer to the practice of using guided meditation to visualize one's ancestors and descendants
Michael Murphy (author) uses the term deep time to refer to the experience of unusual freedom within time or unawareness of time, known to psychologists as the flow state